Zea Abad, (Grid Station Thathri or Madan Chittar) is a village in Thathri sub division of Doda district. It is the part of  panchayat Jangalwar located on the Batote-Kishtwar National Highway.

Location
Zea Abad is located on Batote-Kishtwar National Highway bordering Thathri town on its east.

History
Zea Abad was part of Thathri until that town became a town in 2011. This village had paddy fields in the past that belonged to a person with the name Madan; that is why it was known as Madan Khait or Madan Chittar. When an electricity receiving station for Thathri was built here, it became popular with the name "Grid Station Thathri."

Demographics
Zea Abad village is located in Phagsoo tehsil (earlier Thathri). There was only single government school in this village known as Govt Primary School Zea Abad which was closed in 2013.

References

Villages in Doda district
Chenab Valley